Beinn Dronaig (797 m) is a mountain in the Northwest Highlands of Wester Ross, Scotland.

A remote peak northeast of the village of Dornie, it is located in one of the wildest parts of the Highlands, and provides fantastic views from its summit.

References

Mountains and hills of the Northwest Highlands
Marilyns of Scotland
Corbetts